OVF may refer to:
 Open Virtualization Format, an open standard for packaging and distributing virtual appliances
 Optical viewfinder